The Man Who Loved Clowns is a 1992 novel by June Rae Wood about coping with mental disability in the family. The story is based on Wood's personal experience of life with her brother Richard who himself had Down Syndrome. Wood also wrote a sequel, entitled Turtle on a Fence Post, set one year later.

Awards
 1995 Mark Twain Award in Missouri
 1995 William Allen White Award in Kansas

See also
A Corner of the Universe by Ann M. Martin, a novel with a similar theme

References

External links
 Selected excerpts from the book

1992 American novels
American children's novels
Mark Twain Awards
1992 children's books